The National Award for Plastic Arts is one of Spain's National Culture Awards for Fine Arts, along with the  and . Established in 1980, it is granted annually by the Ministry of Culture and Sport to recognize the meritorious work of contemporary plastic artists. It is given for works or actions published in the prior year which contribute to the enrichment of Spain's cultural heritage. Despite being developed by an administrative body, the selection of the award's winners is intended to be a true reflection of the values and feelings of society. It is endowed with a prize of 30,000 euros.

Candidates for the award are presented by the members of a jury, or by entities related to the pertinent artistic or cultural activities, through reasoned proposals addressed to the Minister of Culture or to the jurors themselves.

In 2010 the artist Santiago Sierra rejected the award, claiming his independence from a state which shows "contempt for the mandate to work for the common good".

Winners

See also
 Spanish art

References

External links
  

1980 establishments in Spain
Arts awards
Awards established in 1980
Spanish art
Spanish awards